Arthur Trestrail (7 June 1921 – 20 October 2014) was a Trinidad cricketer. He played six first-class matches for Trinidad and Tobago between 1941 and 1947. His brother, Kenneth, also played first-class cricket.

References

External links
 

1921 births
2014 deaths
Trinidad and Tobago cricketers